Mapo Area is an area and a town located near the northwest corner of Shunyi District, Beijing, China. It borders Zhaoquanying and Niulanshan Towns to the north, Shuangfeng Subdistrict to the east, Nanfaxin Town to the south, and Gaoliying Town to the west. In 2020, it was home to 38,547 residents.

The name Mapo is derived from the town's historical location as a horse farm during the Ming dynasty and near the Po Hill.

History

Administrative divisions 

In the year 2021, Mapo Area consisted of 11 subdivisions, more specifically 4 communities and 7 villages:

See also 

 List of township-level divisions of Beijing

References 

Shunyi District
Towns in Beijing